Arab refugee camps may refer to:
 Lampedusa immigrant reception center on the Italian island of Lampedusa
 Palestine refugee camps
 Syrian refugee camps in Turkey, Lebanon, Jordan and Iraqi Kurdistan
 Libyan transitional camps in Tunisia, Egypt and Chad 
 Sahrawi refugee camps in Tindouf Province, Algeria

Refugee camps by refugee origin